Dhahab River or Dhahab Valley ( Gold River or Gold Valley), also in medieval times known as Wadi Butnan or Butnan Habib, is an intermittent river and valley in northern Syria. The principal towns in the valley are al-Bab, Bizaah and Tadef.

The river is located on the Aleppo plateau in the eastern part of Aleppo Governorate, 30 km east of Aleppo. It drains the heights north of al-Bab and runs from north to south for about 50 km before terminating at Sabkhat al-Jabbul.

History
During the early Muslim period the Arabic sources referred to the valley as Wadi Butnan (the lowland valley) or Butnan Habib (the lowlands of Habib), after the Muslim commander Habib ibn Maslama al-Fihri, who conquered the area during the early Muslim conquests (630s–640s).

The Umayyad caliph Abd al-Malik camped in the valley in the winter of 689–690 in preparation of a confrontation with Mus'ab ibn al-Zubayr of Iraq. In 901, it was sacked by the Qarmatians. In 966, it was ravaged by Nikephoros II Phokas. Later on, Kilabi chief Abu Za'ida led a tribal coalition in the region which defeated Seljuk reinforcements to Tutush I who was besieging Aleppo during the reign of Sabiq ibn Mahmud of the Mirdasid dynasty in 1080. However, Seljuk revenge led to the extermination of the Ismaili community. In 1098, it was attacked by the Armenians in the region during the events of the First Crusade. The lord of Tell Bashir, Jocelin, devastated the region in 1125. In 1138, it was occupied by the Byzantine emperor John II Komnenos. It was later captured by Nur ad-Din of the Zengid dynasty.

Dams
Two dams have been constructed on the river, the ʼUm-Julūd Dam and Shabāʼ Dam. Recently water from the Euphrates is being diverted to the river to enhance irrigation in the valley.

References

Bibliography

Aleppo
Aleppo Governorate
Rivers of Syria